Room for the Moon is the third studio album by Russian musician Kate NV. It was released on June 12, 2020, by RVNG Intl.

Critical reception

Room for the Moon was met with widespread acclaim reviews from critics. Jay Singh of The Line of Best Fit said "Room for the Moon appears to have it all, whilst remaining cohesive—it's an eccentric entity in itself, but also the work of one."

Accolades

Track listing

References

2020 albums
Kate NV albums